Ryan Wallace (born 30 July 1990) is a Scottish professional footballer who plays as a forward for Dumbarton. He started his career at Heart of Midlothian, before moving on to play for Airdrie United, East Fife, Dunfermline Athletic, Albion Rovers, Stranraer and Arbroath, as well as Raith Rovers where he had a short loan spell.

Career

Hearts
A member of Hearts's under-19 squad, Wallace joined Raith Rovers on loan in October 2009. He made his debut on 31 October, scoring in a 2–1 win over Partick Thistle. In all he made four appearances scoring once before returning to Hearts.

He made his Hearts debut on 23 January 2010, coming on as a late substitute in their Scottish Premier League match against Rangers at Ibrox. He made one more first team appearance against Hamilton Academical before being released by the club at the end of his contract in May 2010.

Airdrie
Following his release from Hearts, Wallace signed for Scottish Second Division side Airdrie United. He made his debut on 24 July 2010, in a 2–1 defeat to Ayr United in the Challenge Cup, with his league debut coming on 7 August 2010, against East Fife. Wallace scored his first goal for the club on 14 August, from the penalty spot, however was sent off in the dying minutes of the game for a professional foul. He missed four weeks of the season after suffering a broken jaw in a friendly with Queen's Park.

His contract with Airdrie was terminated in January 2011 by mutual consent, following a fight in the stadium car park with fellow player Scott Gibson. In all he made eleven appearances, scoring three times.

East Fife
Wallace then joined fellow Scottish Second Division side East Fife. He made his debut as a substitute on 19 February 2011, in a league match against Brechin City. He scored his first goals for the club on 23 February, netting twice in a 4–0 victory over Ayr United. He won the Scottish Football League Ginger Boot award for April 2011. In all Wallace made thirteen appearances, scoring eight times in his debut season.

In his second season with the club, Wallace scored 27 goals, including 20 in the league which attracted the interest of various SPFL clubs. One of his goals came against SPL side Aberdeen at Pittodrie, a goal which would help his side defeat the Dons and progress to the next round of the League Cup. In April 2012, he was named among the nominees for the PFA Scotland Scottish Third Division Player of the Year.

Dunfermline
On 1 June 2012, it was announced that Wallace had agreed to join Scottish First Division side Dunfermline Athletic, pending a compensation agreement with East Fife because of his age. On 8 June, the deal was finalised and he signed a two-year contract. After winning the Scottish League One title with the Pars, Wallace was released by the club at the end of the 2015–16 season.

Albion Rovers & Stranraer
A month after leaving East End Park, Wallace joined Scottish League One side Albion Rovers on a one-year deal. Wallace scored 11 goals in 31 appearances for Rovers, before signing with fellow League One club Stranraer on 16 May 2017. Wallace enjoyed a good scoring record with Stranraer, however, with the club struggling financially, Wallace was allowed to leave the club at the end of December 2017.

Arbroath
In January 2018, Wallace signed for fellow League One side Arbroath for an undisclosed fee. He was named Scottish League One Player of the Month for August 2018, after scoring three goals and assisting five others during the month. Wallace was part of the squad that won the League One title in 2018–19, scoring the goal that earned the point needed to clinch the title.

East Fife
On 14 May 2019, it was announced that East Fife had agreed a fee with Arbroath for Wallace to return to the club, with the transfer to be completed in the summer of 2019. He left the club after three seasons in June 2022 following the Fifers' relegation to Scottish League Two.

Dumbarton 
Wallace joined fellow Scottish League Two side Dumbarton on a two-year deal on 11 June 2022. He scored an 88th-minute winner on his league debut for the club against former side Albion Rovers.

Career statistics

Honours

Club
Dunfermline Athletic
Scottish League One: 2015–16

Arbroath
Scottish League One: 2018–19

Individual
 Scottish League One Player of the Month: August 2018

References

External links

1990 births
Living people
Footballers from Bellshill
Scottish footballers
Association football forwards
Heart of Midlothian F.C. players
Raith Rovers F.C. players
Airdrieonians F.C. players
East Fife F.C. players
Dunfermline Athletic F.C. players
Albion Rovers F.C. players
Stranraer F.C. players
Arbroath F.C. players
Scottish Premier League players
Scottish Football League players
Scottish Professional Football League players